Đặng Quang Huy (born 12 May 1992) is a Vietnamese footballer who plays as a midfielder for V.League 1 club Hải Phòng.

Career
Đặng Quang Huy began his career at  Viettel, and latter joined Hải Phòng in 2015. He spent half of the 2015 season out on load with XSKT Cần Thơ, although he did play an important role in Hải Phòng's 2016 season.

International career
After Quế Ngọc Hải suffered an injury in October 2016, Quang Huy was surprisingly selected as Ngọc Hải's back up in the Vietnam squad for the 2016 AFF Championship.

Honours
Công An Nhân Dân
V.League 2: 2022

References 

1992 births
Living people
Vietnamese footballers
Association football midfielders
V.League 1 players
Haiphong FC players
Can Tho FC players
Ho Chi Minh City FC players
Than Quang Ninh FC players
People from Vĩnh Phúc province